Buchs railway station could refer to:

 Buchs AG railway station in Buchs, Aargau, Switzerland
 Buchs SG railway station in Buchs, St. Gallen, Switzerland